The De La Salle Zobel Chorale (DLSZ Chorale) is a musical group from De La Salle-Santiago Zobel School in Muntinlupa, Philippines. The DLSZ Chorale consists of two sub-groups, Grade School Choir and High School Choir. The Chorale's elite group, "Young Singers" or "YS", are members that are specially selected from SSA (Soprano 1-Soprano 2-Alto) section from the High School Chorale.

Composition
The De La Salle Zobel Chorale is composed of students of De La Salle Zobel who have undergone and passed the auditions that are conducted one week after the orientation for the general music courses. These students are given the opportunity to develop their singing talents through individual and group choral activities. The Chorale is composed of two groups, composed of Grade School and High School students.

Musical concepts, such as melody, rhythm, form, tempo, and dynamics are integrated into the group's repertoire, which includes songs ranging from the sacred to the contemporary and pop. The repertoire are also in Latin, English, and Filipino.

The group performs annually during the Angelo King Center's Performing Arts Festival that are held on February. The current principal conductor is Marites Panaligan.

Young Singers
The Young Singers (Popularly known as YS) is the special elite group from the SSA Section of the High School Choir. A separate audition is done for an eligible member to get in the elite group. Also, they have a separate recital which showcases the songs they learned in the whole school year. Their repertoire consists of classical music, ethnic music and folk songs which are arranged into harder pieces.

References

External links
 https://groups.yahoo.com/group/the-dlsz-chorale

See also
 Culture of the Philippines
 De La Salle Zobel Symphony Orchestra

Filipino choirs
Musical groups from Metro Manila